Luke Demetre (born 22 March 1990) is a Canadian bobsledder from New Glasgow, Nova Scotia. He competed at the 2014 Winter Olympics in Sochi, in four-man bobsleigh after initially attending as an alternate.

References

External links 
 

1990 births
Living people
Bobsledders at the 2014 Winter Olympics
Canadian male bobsledders
Olympic bobsledders of Canada